Cantabria was the name of a number of ships.
, lost off the Canary Islands in 1862
, sunk by nationalist raider Nadir off the coast of Norfolk, United Kingdom, during the Spanish Civil War

See also
 , a replenishment oiler that entered service with the Spanish Navy in 2010

Ship names